An environment minister (sometimes minister of the environment or secretary of the environment) is a cabinet position charged with protecting the natural environment and promoting wildlife conservation. The areas associated with the duties of an environmental minister depends largely of the needs of an individual countries or states.

The world's first minister of the environment was the British Politician Peter Walker from the Conservative Party. He was appointed in 1970.

Country-related articles

Africa 
: Minister of Environment, Forest and Climate Change
: Minister of Water and Environmental Affairs

Americas
: Ministry of the Environment and Sustainable Development
: Minister of Environment and Water
: Minister of the Environment and Climate Change
: Minister of the Environment
: Ministry for the Environment
: Ministry of Environment and Sustainable Development
: Ministry of Environment and Energy
: Ministry of Science, Technology and Environment
: Ministry of the Environment
: Secretary of the Environment
: Ministry of the Environment and Natural Resources
: Ministry of Environment
: Ministry of Environment
: Administrator of the Environmental Protection Agency and Secretary of the Interior
: Ministry of Environment
: Ministry of Environment and Natural Resources

Asia 
: Ministry of Ecology and Natural Resources
: Minister of Environmental Protection Administration
: Secretary for the Environment
: Ministry of Environment and Forestry
: Minister of the Environment
: Ministry of Environment
: Minister of Environment and Water
: Minister of Environment
: Secretary of Environment and Natural Resources
: Ministry of Sustainability and the Environment
: Ministry of Natural Resources and Environment
: Ministry of Environment and Urban Planning
: Ministry of Natural Resources and Environment

Europe 
: Ministry of Environment, Forests and Water Administration
: Minister for Agriculture, Environment, Forestry and Water Management
: Ministry of the Environment
: Minister of the Environment
: Minister of the Environment
: Commissioner for the Environment
: Minister of Environment
: Minister of Ecology (as of 2017, Ministry for an Ecological and Solidary Transition)
: Federal Minister for the Environment, Nature Conservation, Building and Nuclear Safety
: Minister for the Environment, Energy and Climate Change
: Minister for the Environment and Natural Resources
: Minister for the Environment, Climate and Communications
: Ministry of the Environment
: Ministry of Environment
: Minister of Economic Affairs and Climate Policy
: Ministry of Environment and Physical Planning
: Minister of the Environment
: Ministry of Environment and Climate Change
: Ministry of the Environment, Mining and Spatial Planning
: Minister of the Environment
: Environment Ministry
: Secretary of State for Environment, Food and Rural Affairs
Northern Ireland: Minister for the Environment
: Cabinet Secretary for Rural Affairs and the Environment

Oceania 
: Minister for the Environment
Minister for Environment and Heritage (New South Wales)
Minister for Environment and Natural Resources (Northern Territory)
Minister for Environment (Western Australia)
Minister for the Environment (Victoria)
: Minister for the Environment

See also

 List of ministers of the environment
 
 

 
 
Environment